Joseph S. Miller House is a historic home located at Kenova, Wayne County, West Virginia. It was built in 1891, in the Queen Anne style with Eastlake decorative elements.  It is a two-story frame dwelling on a sandstone foundation with tower.  It features a combination of wood fish scale, diamond and octagon
shingles on the balcony, the west bay, and tower sections.

It was listed on the National Register of Historic Places in 1989.

References

Houses on the National Register of Historic Places in West Virginia
Queen Anne architecture in West Virginia
Houses completed in 1891
Houses in Wayne County, West Virginia
Stick-Eastlake architecture in West Virginia
National Register of Historic Places in Wayne County, West Virginia